Daba is a town under the administration of Puning, Guangdong, China. , it administers Daba Residential Neighborhood and the following 26 villages:
Daba Village
Baikeng Village
Banjing Village
Sheqian Village
Macuozhai Village
Fumeiling Village
Tieshanyang Village
Jiujiang Village
Liangtian Village
Shanding Village
Hengshan Village
Pinglin Village
Zhaihe Village
Xinxi Village
Huludi Village
Beiwu Village
Laodongkeng Village
Xindongkeng Village
Dingshenshui Village
Humei Village
Shang Village
Yueku Village
Duxiangliao Village
Huadong Village
Xianyun Village
Taixing Village

Daba covers an area of 59 km2. By 2017, Daba Town has a population of 89860. The main transportation methods are bus and car. The provincial highway is just across the town center. Daba is in the tropical zone and windy all year around. Summer starts from May and usually ends in December. Winter starts from December and ends in April.  Raining season usually lasts from April to May. The main economy for Daba is clothing processing. The majority of Daba people are Teochew people. Traditional religious like Buddhism and Taoism are still prevalent in Daba.

References 

Towns in Guangdong
Puning